Stephen Robert Blass (born April 18, 1942) is an American former professional baseball player and television sports color commentator. He played a key role in the Pirates victory over the Baltimore Orioles in the 1971 World Series when he recorded two complete game victories. He remains the last National League pitcher to throw a complete game in Game Seven of a World Series. After his playing career ended, Blass had a 34-year career as a television sports commentator for Pittsburgh Pirates games.

Playing career
Blass was born in Canaan, Connecticut. Signed by the Pittsburgh Pirates in 1960, he made his major league debut at the age of 22 in 1964 and joined the team permanently in 1966. He won 18 games in 1968, including a 2.12 ERA with seven shutouts, both career highs, and he finished particularly strong, winning the NL Player of the Month award for September with a 5–1 record, 1.65 ERA, and 46 SO. In 1969 he won 16 games with a career-high 147 strikeouts. From 1969 to 1972 he won 60 games, with a career-high 19 victories in 1972. In that season, he was a member of the National League team in the 1972 All-Star Game and was the runner up to Steve Carlton for the National League Cy Young Award.

In the 1971 World Series against the Baltimore Orioles, Blass pitched two complete game wins, allowing only seven hits and two runs in 18 innings, and was the winning pitcher in the 7th and deciding game. He finished second in the voting for World Series MVP behind teammate Roberto Clemente.

In a ten-season major league career, Blass posted a 103–76 record with 896 strikeouts and a 3.63 ERA in 1,597 innings pitched, including 16 shutouts and 57 complete games.

"Steve Blass disease"

Besides his Series performance, Blass is best known for his sudden and inexplicable loss of control after the 1972 season. His ERA climbed to 9.85 in the 1973 season, during which he walked 84 batters in  innings, and struck out only 27. After spending most of 1974 in the minor leagues, he retired from baseball in March 1975. Two months later writer Roger Angell chronicled Blass's travails in an essay in The New Yorker.

A condition referred to as "Steve Blass disease" has become a part of baseball lexicon. The "diagnosis" is applied to talented players who inexplicably and permanently seem to lose their ability to throw a baseball accurately. The fielder's variant of "Steve Blass disease" is sometimes referred to in baseball terminology as "Steve Sax syndrome".

Notable victims of "Steve Blass disease" include Rick Ankiel, Mark Wohlers, Dontrelle Willis, Ricky Romero, and Daniel Bard.

In an interview years later, Blass stated that he was content with how his career panned out, mentioning that he had gotten ten good years with the Pirates, won 100 games, and appeared in a World Series. He did mention that the sudden death of teammate and close friend Roberto Clemente in the offseason before he lost control – and the associated grief related to suddenly losing someone so close – was not a factor in him losing his control.

In pop culture
In House, MD season three, episode 21, Dr. Gregory House thinks that Dr. Eric Foreman has gotten the Yips from killing a patient in the previous episode. He briefly explains the condition and says that Dr. Foreman has lost his confidence. In his explanation he mentions, by name, Pittsburgh Pirates’ World Series champion Steve Blass as having suffered the condition.

The Season 5 episode of Northern Exposure “Blood Ties” features an explicit reference to Blass during a discussion of Dr. Joel Fleischman's sudden inability to hit a vein while attempting to draw blood.

In season 1 of Prison Playbook episode 14, the main character, Kim Je-hyuk, is attributed with Steve Blass disease when trying to make his comeback in baseball. Another reference is made to a golfer who suddenly got the Yips.

Post-playing career
Blass worked in the late 1970s as a Pittsburgh-area salesman for Jostens, a company that manufactures school class rings. He joined the Pirates' TV and radio broadcast team in 1983 as a part-time color commentator, earning a full-time post in 1986. Before the 2005 season, he announced that he would announce only home games from then on to spend more time with his family. Blass retired from broadcasting in 2019 after 60 years with the organization as a player and broadcaster.

He was inducted into the Kinston Professional Baseball Hall of Fame in 1997.

Blass' autobiography, A Pirate For Life (Triumph Books), was released on May 1, 2012. His memoirs, co-written with Erik Sherman, encompass his struggles with Steve Blass disease and his days as a color commentator for the Pirates.

Blass was announced as an inaugural member of the Pittsburgh Pirates Hall Of Fame on August 7, 2022.

See also

Pittsburgh Pirates broadcasters and media
List of Major League Baseball players who spent their entire career with one franchise

References

External links

1942 births
Águilas Cibaeñas players
American expatriate baseball players in the Dominican Republic
Asheville Tourists players
Baseball players from Connecticut
Batavia Pirates players
Charleston Charlies players
Columbus Jets players
Dubuque Packers players
Kingsport Pirates players
Kinston Eagles players
Living people
Major League Baseball broadcasters
Major League Baseball pitchers
National League All-Stars
People from Canaan, Connecticut
Pittsburgh Pirates announcers
Pittsburgh Pirates players
Housatonic Valley Regional High School alumni